Márk Simon (born 4 June 1996) is a Hungarian football player who plays for Tiszakécske.

Career

Paks
On 23 September 2017, Simon played his first match for Paks in a 1-0 win against Balmazújvárs in the Hungarian League.

Career statistics

Club

References

External links

1996 births
Living people
People from Salgótarján
Hungarian footballers
Association football midfielders
Paksi FC players
Csákvári TK players
Győri ETO FC players
Tiszakécske FC footballers
Nemzeti Bajnokság I players
Nemzeti Bajnokság II players
Nemzeti Bajnokság III players
Sportspeople from Nógrád County